David da Silva Livramento (born 18 December 1983) is a Portuguese professional road bicycle racer, who currently rides for UCI Continental team .

Major results
2012
 1st Overall GP Onda-Boavista
1st Stage 1
 1st Circuit de Nafarros
2013
 5th Road race, National Road Championships

References

External links

1983 births
Living people
Portuguese male cyclists
People from Faro, Portugal
Sportspeople from Faro District